In algebra, a quintic function is a function of the form

In other words, a quintic function is defined by a polynomial of degree five.

Because they have an odd degree, normal quintic functions appear similar to normal cubic functions when graphed, except they may possess one additional local maximum and one additional local minimum. The derivative of a quintic function is a quartic function.

Setting  and assuming  produces a quintic equation of the form:
 
Solving quintic equations in terms of radicals (nth roots) was a major problem in algebra from the 16th century, when cubic and quartic equations were solved, until the first half of the 19th century, when the impossibility of such a general solution was proved with the Abel–Ruffini theorem.

Finding roots of a quintic equation

Finding the roots (zeros) of a given polynomial has been a prominent mathematical problem.

Solving linear, quadratic, cubic and quartic equations by factorization into radicals can always be done, no matter whether the roots are rational or irrational, real or complex; there are formulae that yield the required solutions. However, there is no algebraic expression (that is, in terms of radicals) for the solutions of general quintic equations over the rationals; this statement is known as the Abel–Ruffini theorem, first asserted in 1799 and completely proved in 1824. This result also holds for equations of higher degrees.

Some quintics may be solved in terms of radicals. However, the solution is generally too complicated to be used in practice. Instead, numerical approximations are calculated using a root-finding algorithm for polynomials.

Solvable quintics

Some quintic equations can be solved in terms of radicals. For example, it has been shown that

has solutions in radicals if and only if it has an integer solution or r is one of ±15, ±22440, or ±2759640, in which cases the polynomial is reducible.

As solving reducible quintic equations reduces immediately to solving polynomials of lower degree, only irreducible quintic equations are considered in the remainder of this section, and the term "quintic" will refer only to irreducible quintics. A solvable quintic is thus an irreducible quintic polynomial whose roots may be expressed in terms of radicals.

To characterize solvable quintics, and more generally solvable polynomials of higher degree, Évariste Galois developed techniques which gave rise to group theory and Galois theory. Applying these techniques, Arthur Cayley found a general criterion for determining whether any given quintic is solvable. This criterion is the following.

Given the equation

the Tschirnhaus transformation , which depresses the quintic (that is, removes the term of degree four), gives the equation

,

where

and

Cayley's result allows us to test if a quintic is solvable. If it is the case, finding its roots is a more difficult problem, which consists of expressing the roots in terms of radicals involving the coefficients of the quintic and the rational root of Cayley's resolvent.

In 1888, George Paxton Young described how to solve a solvable quintic equation, without providing an explicit formula; in 2004, Daniel Lazard wrote out a three-page formula.

Quintics in Bring–Jerrard form

There are several parametric representations of solvable quintics of the form , called the Bring–Jerrard form.

During the second half of the 19th century, John Stuart Glashan, George Paxton Young, and Carl Runge gave such a parameterization: an irreducible quintic with rational coefficients in Bring–Jerrard form
is solvable if and only if either  or it may be written

In 1994, Blair Spearman and Kenneth S. Williams gave an alternative,

The relationship between the 1885 and 1994 parameterizations can be seen by defining the expression

where . Using the negative case of the square root yields, after scaling variables, the first parametrization while the positive case gives the second.

The substitution ,  in the Spearman-Williams parameterization allows one to not exclude the special case , giving the following result:

Roots of a solvable quintic
A polynomial equation is solvable by radicals if its Galois group is a solvable group.

If the quintic is solvable, one of the solutions may be represented by an algebraic expression involving a fifth root and at most two square roots, generally nested. The other solutions may then be obtained either by changing the fifth root or by multiplying all the occurrences of the fifth root by the same power of a primitive 5th root of unity, such as

In fact, all four primitive fifth roots of unity may be obtained by changing the signs of the square roots appropriately; namely, the expression

where , yields the four distinct primitive fifth roots of unity.

It follows that one may need four different square roots for writing all the roots of a solvable quintic. Even for the first root that involves at most two square roots, the expression of the solutions in terms of radicals is usually highly complicated. However, when no square root is needed, the form of the first solution may be rather simple, as for the equation , for which the only real solution is

 

Then the only real solution  is given by

 

or, equivalently, by

However these -th roots may not be computed independently (this would provide  roots instead of ). Thus a correct solution needs to express all these -roots in term of one of them. Galois theory shows that this is always theoretically possible, even if the resulting formula may be too large to be of any use.

In these cases, the formula for the roots is much simpler, as for the solvable de Moivre quintic

where the auxiliary equation has two zero roots and reduces, by factoring them out, to the quadratic equation

such that the five roots of the de Moivre quintic are given by

where yi is any root of the auxiliary quadratic equation and ω is any of the four primitive 5th roots of unity.  This can be easily generalized to construct a solvable septic and other odd degrees, not necessarily prime.

Other solvable quintics

There are infinitely many solvable quintics in Bring-Jerrard form which have been parameterized in a preceding section.

Up to the scaling of the variable, there are exactly five solvable quintics of the shape , which are (where s is a scaling factor):

Paxton Young (1888) gave a number of examples of solvable quintics:
{|  ||
|-
|  ||
|-
| ||
|-
|  ||
|-
|  ||  Root: 
|-
| ||
|-
|  ||
|-
| ||
|-
|||
|-
| ||
|-
|  ||
|-
| ||
|-
|  ||
|-
| ||
|-
|  ||
|-
| ||
|}

An infinite sequence of solvable quintics may be constructed, whose roots are sums of th roots of unity, with  being a prime number:

{|
|-
|  || || Roots: 
|-
| || || Root: 
|-
| || || Root: 
|-
| ||  || 
|-
| || || 
|}

There are also two parameterized families of solvable quintics:
The Kondo–Brumer quintic,

and the family depending on the parameters 

where

Casus irreducibilis

Analogously to cubic equations, there are solvable quintics which have five real roots all of whose solutions in radicals involve roots of complex numbers. This is casus irreducibilis for the quintic, which is discussed in Dummit. Indeed, if an irreducible quintic has all roots real, no root can be expressed purely in terms of real radicals (as is true for all polynomial degrees that are not powers of 2).

Beyond radicals

In 1858 Charles Hermite showed that the Bring radical could be characterized in terms of the Jacobi theta functions and their associated elliptic modular functions, using an approach similar to the more familiar approach of solving cubic equations by means of trigonometric functions. At around the same time, Leopold Kronecker, using group theory, developed a simpler way of deriving Hermite's result, as had Francesco Brioschi. Later, Felix Klein came up with a method that relates the symmetries of the icosahedron, Galois theory, and the elliptic modular functions that are featured in Hermite's solution, giving an explanation for why they should appear at all, and developed his own solution in terms of generalized hypergeometric functions.

Solving with Bring radicals 

A Tschirnhaus transformation, which may be computed by solving a quartic equation, reduces the general quintic equation of the form 
 
to the Bring–Jerrard normal form .

The roots of this equation cannot be expressed by radicals. However, in 1858, Charles Hermite published the first known solution of this equation in terms of elliptic functions.
At around the same time Francesco Brioschi 
and Leopold Kronecker
came upon equivalent solutions.

See Bring radical for details on these solutions and some related ones.

Application to celestial mechanics
Solving for the locations of the Lagrangian points of an astronomical orbit in which the masses of both objects are non-negligible involves solving a quintic.

More precisely, the locations of L2 and L1 are the solutions to the following equations, where the gravitational forces of two masses on a third (for example, Sun and Earth on satellites such as Gaia and the James Webb Space Telescope at L2 and SOHO at L1) provide the satellite's centripetal force necessary to be in a synchronous orbit with Earth around the Sun:

 

The ± sign corresponds to L2 and L1, respectively; G is the gravitational constant, ω the angular velocity, r the distance of the satellite to Earth, R the distance Sun to Earth (that is, the semi-major axis of Earth's orbit), and m, ME, and MS are the respective masses of satellite, Earth, and Sun.

Using Kepler's Third Law  and rearranging all terms yields the quintic

 

with:
 .

The Sun–Earth Lagrangian points L2 and L1 are usually given as 1.5 million km from Earth.

If the mass of the smaller object (ME) is much smaller than the mass of the larger object (MS), then the quintic equation can be greatly reduced and L1 and L2 are at approximately the radius of the Hill sphere, given by:

 

That also yields  for satellites at L1 and L2 in the Sun-Earth system.

See also
Sextic equation
Septic function
Theory of equations

Notes

References
 Charles Hermite, "Sur la résolution de l'équation du cinquème degré", Œuvres de Charles Hermite, 2:5–21, Gauthier-Villars, 1908.
 Felix Klein, Lectures on the Icosahedron and the Solution of Equations of the Fifth Degree, trans. George Gavin Morrice, Trübner & Co., 1888. .
 Leopold Kronecker, "Sur la résolution de l'equation du cinquième degré, extrait d'une lettre adressée à M. Hermite", Comptes Rendus de l'Académie des Sciences, 46:1:1150–1152 1858.
 Blair Spearman and Kenneth S. Williams, "Characterization of solvable quintics , American Mathematical Monthly, 101:986–992 (1994).
 Ian Stewart, Galois Theory 2nd Edition, Chapman and Hall, 1989. . Discusses Galois Theory in general including a proof of insolvability of the general quintic.
 Jörg Bewersdorff, Galois theory for beginners: A historical perspective, American Mathematical Society, 2006. . Chapter 8 gives a description of the solution of solvable quintics .
 Victor S. Adamchik and David J. Jeffrey, "Polynomial transformations of Tschirnhaus, Bring and Jerrard," ACM SIGSAM Bulletin, Vol. 37, No. 3, September 2003, pp. 90–94.
 Ehrenfried Walter von Tschirnhaus, "A method for removing all intermediate terms from a given equation," ACM SIGSAM Bulletin, Vol. 37, No. 1, March 2003, pp. 1–3.

External links
 Mathworld - Quintic Equation – more details on methods for solving Quintics.
 Solving Solvable Quintics – a method for solving solvable quintics due to David S. Dummit.
 A method for removing all intermediate terms from a given equation - a recent English translation of Tschirnhaus' 1683 paper.

Equations
Galois theory
Polynomial functions